Bernard P. "Ben" Omann, Sr. (June 1, 1919 – November 19, 1986) was an American farmer,  insurance agent, and politician.

From St. Joseph, Minnesota, Omann went to Saint John's Preparatory School. Omann was a farmer and was the owner of Omann Insurance Agency. Omann served in the Minnesota Senate in 1980 after being elected in a special election. He was a Republican. Omann then served in the Minnesota House of Representatives from 1983 until his death in 1986. Omann died from cancer in a hospital in St. Cloud, Minnesota. His son Bernie Omann also served in the Minnesota Legislature.

Notes

External links

1919 births
1986 deaths
20th-century American politicians
People from St. Joseph, Minnesota
Businesspeople from Minnesota
Farmers from Minnesota
Republican Party Minnesota state senators
Republican Party members of the Minnesota House of Representatives
Deaths from cancer in Minnesota
20th-century American businesspeople